Anton Diffring (born Alfred Pollack, 20 October 1916 – 19 May 1989) was a German-born character actor who had an extensive career in the United Kingdom from the 1940s to the 1980s, latterly appearing in international films. He appeared in over 50 features and was typically cast as a Nazi officer.

Early life
Diffring was born Alfred Pollack in Koblenz. His father, Solomon Pollack, was a Jewish shop-owner who managed to avoid internment and survived Nazi rule in Germany. His mother, Bertha Pollack (née Diffring), was Christian. He studied acting in Berlin and Vienna, but there is conjecture about when he left Germany prior to the outbreak of World War II. The audio commentary for the Doctor Who series Silver Nemesis mentions that he left in 1936 to escape persecution due to his homosexuality. Other accounts point to him leaving in 1939 and settling in Canada, where he was interned in 1940, which is unlikely as he appears in the Ealing Studios film Convoy (released in July 1940, as the officer of U-37, in an uncredited role). His sister Jacqueline Diffring moved to England and became a sculptor.

While in England, he quickly became fluent in English and for a time worked in the War Office as an interpreter. Although he made two fleeting uncredited appearances in films in 1940, it was not until 1950 that his acting career began to take off.

Career

With numerous World War II film and television productions being produced in England from the 1950s, Diffring's "Germanic" physical type of blond hair, pale blue eyes and chiselled features saw him regularly cast in roles as Nazi military officers in films such as Albert R.N.  (1953) and The Colditz Story (1955). Some of his other roles as German characters were in The Heroes of Telemark (1965), The Blue Max (1966), Where Eagles Dare (1968), Zeppelin (1971), as SS officer Reinhard Heydrich in Operation Daybreak (1975) and the football match commentator in Escape to Victory (1981), although he also played a Polish parachutist in The Red Beret (1953). He played Hitler's foreign minister Joachim von Ribbentrop in the American mini-series The Winds of War (1983). In the Italian war movie Uccidete Rommel, shot in the Egyptian desert in 1969, he played the role of a British officer of the SAS.

On stage, Diffring played the title role in the musical Mister Venus, opposite Frankie Howerd. It opened at the Prince of Wales Theatre on 23 October 1958 but closed after only sixteen performances. In the show, Diffring sang two solo numbers: "Love Like Ours" and "Tradition". The book was by Ray Galton and Johnny Speight, while the music was by Trevor H. Stanford (Russ Conway) and Norman Newell.

He played a part in the TV mini-series Flambards as the aeronautical pioneer who assists William Russell (Alan Parnaby), second in line of inheritance to the Flambards Estate, who is obsessed with flying. Diffring's character was a German living in Britain shortly before the beginning of the Great War.

Diffring starred in several horror films, such as The Man Who Could Cheat Death (1959) and Circus of Horrors (1960) and played the lead in the television pilot Tales of Frankenstein (1958). He also appeared in international films, such as Fahrenheit 451 (1966), an English-language film directed by François Truffaut. He appeared in the 1964 West German comedy A Mission for Mr. Dodd having previously starred in the West End play Out of Bounds on which it is based.

His final performance was once more as a Nazi for the BBC in the 1988 Doctor Who serial Silver Nemesis.

Death
Diffring died on 19 May 1989 from cancer at his home in Châteauneuf-Grasse, in the South of France, at the age of 72. In a 2002 interview, his longtime friend Arthur Brauss said Diffring had actually died of complications from AIDS. His body was buried in the graveyard of St. Andrew's Church, in the village of White Colne in Essex.

Filmography

Convoy (1940) as U-Boat officer (uncredited)
Neutral Port (1940) as Sailor (uncredited)
State Secret (1950) as State Police Officer at Theatre
Highly Dangerous (1950) as Officer At Station Check Point (uncredited)
Hotel Sahara (1951) as German soldier (uncredited)
Appointment with Venus (1951) as 2nd German soldier
The Woman's Angle (1952) as Peasant
Song of Paris (1952) as Renoir
Top Secret (1952) as East German policeman (uncredited)
Never Let Me Go (1953) as Hotel Desk Clerk (uncredited)
The Red Beret (1953) as The Pole
Park Plaza 605 (1953) as Gregor
Albert R.N. (1953) as Hauptmann Schultz
Operation Diplomat (1953) as Shroder
Betrayed (1954) as Captain Von Stanger
The Sea Shall Not Have Them (1954) as German Pilot
The Colditz Story (1955) as Fischer
I Am a Camera (1955) as Fritz Wendel
Doublecross (1956) as Dmitri Krassin
The Black Tent (1956) as Senior Nazi Officer
Reach for the Sky (1956) as German Stabsfeldwebel
House of Secrets (1956) as Anton Lauderbach
The Traitor (1957) as Joseph Brezina
The Crooked Sky (1957) as Fraser
Lady of Vengeance (1957) as Karnak
Seven Thunders (1957) as Colonel Trautman
A Question of Adultery (1958) as Carl Dieter
Mark of the Phoenix (1958) as Inspector Schell
The Man Who Could Cheat Death (1959) as Dr. Georges Bonnet
Circus of Horrors (1960) as Dr. Schuler
Enter Inspector Duval (1961) as Inspector Duval
Incident at Midnight (1963) as Dr. Erik Leichner
A Mission for Mr. Dodd (1964) as Howard
Lana, Queen of the Amazons (1964) as Professor Van Vries
Operation Crossbow (1965) as SS Sturmbannfuhrer (uncredited)
Shots in Threequarter Time (1965) as Burger
The Heroes of Telemark (1965) as Major Frick
The Blue Max (1966) as Holbach
Fahrenheit 451 (1966) as Fabian
The Double Man (1967) as Berthold
Counterpoint (1968) as Colonel Arndt
Where Eagles Dare (1968) as Colonel Paul Kramer
Man on Horseback (1969) as Kurfürst
 (Kill Rommel!, 1969) as Captain Richard Howell
Zeppelin (1971) as Colonel Hirsch
The Iguana with the Tongue of Fire (1971) as Ambassador Sobiesky
The Day the Clown Cried (1972, unreleased) as Captain Curt Runkel
The Stuff That Dreams Are Made Of (1972)
Little Mother (1973) as The Cardinal
Mark of the Devil Part II (1973) as Balthasar von Ross
Seven Deaths in the Cat's Eye (1973) as Dr. Franz
The Battle of Sutjeska (1973) as General Alexander Lohr
Tony Arzenta (1973) as Grunwald
Dead Pigeon on Beethoven Street (1974) as Mensur
Shatter (1974) as Hans Leber
The Beast Must Die (1974) as Pavel
Die Antwort kennt nur der Wind (1974) as John Keelwood
Operation Daybreak (1975) as Reichsprotektor Reinhard Heydrich
 (1976) as Lieutnant Slade
The Swiss Conspiracy (1976) as Franz Benninger
Love Letters of a Portuguese Nun (1977) as Old Priest
Vanessa (1977) as Cooper
Waldrausch (1977)
L'imprécateur (1977) as Ronson
Valentino (1977) as Baron Long
Les Indiens sont encore loin (1977) as Le professeur d'allemand
Son of Hitler (1978) as Gernheim
The Unicorn (1978) as Blomich
Io sono mia (1978) as Padre di Suna
It Can Only Get Worse (1979) as Gloria's first husband
Tusk (1980) as John Morrison
Escape to Victory (1981) as German – Chief Commentator – The Commentators
 (1983) as Colonel Henderson
S.A.S. à San Salvador (1983) as Peter Reynolds
 (1985) as Cardinal Millini
Operation Dead End (1986) as Prof. Lang
Wahnfried (1986) as Franz Liszt
 (1986) as Wintrich
Faceless (1987) as Dr. Karl Heinz Moser
 (1988) as George Mamoulian (final film role)

Selected television appearances

Colonel March... (Episode 14: "The Silent Vow", 1956) 
 Edgar Wallace Mysteries episode: Incident At Midnight (1962) .... Dr Erik Leichner
 Scobie in September (6 episodes, 1969) .... Pandorus
Assignment Vienna (8 episodes, 1972–1973) .... Inspector Hoffman
Thriller (Series 2, Episode 3: "Kiss Me and Die", 1974) .... Jonathan Lanceford
The Galton & Simpson Playhouse (Episode 1: "Car Along the Pass", 1977) .... Heinz Steiner
 (1978) .... Arnold
Flambards (5 episodes, 1979) .... Mr. Dermot 
The Old Fox: Morddrohung (1980) .... Leo Steglitz 
Arsène Lupin joue et perd (TV mini-series, 1980) .... Wilhelm II
Derrick: Am Abgrund (1981) .... Alfred Bandera
Ein Winter auf Mallorca (1982) .... Konsul Fleury
The Winds of War (4 episodes, 1983) .... Joachim von Ribbentrop
Derrick: Angriff aus dem Dunkel (1984) .... Scherer
Der Besuch (1984) .... Crozier
Weltuntergang (1984) 
Opération O.P.E.N. (1 episode, 1984) .... Beejlab
The Masks of Death (1984) .... Graf Udo Von Felseck of Purbridge Manor
Messieurs les jurés (1 episode, 1985) .... Karl Düren
Jane Horney (TV mini-series, 1985) .... Adm. Wilhelm Canaris
Derrick: Nachtstreife (1987) .... de Mohl
Doctor Who serial Silver Nemesis (3 episodes, 1988) .... De Flores

Sources

Brian McFarlane, The Encyclopedia of British Film, Methuen, 2003.

References

External links

1916 births
1989 deaths
20th-century German male actors
German gay actors
German expatriates in England
German expatriates in France
German male film actors
German male television actors
German people of Jewish descent
Actors from Koblenz
People from the Rhine Province
20th-century German LGBT people
German male stage actors
AIDS-related deaths in France